Permochiton is an extinct genus of polyplacophoran molluscs. Permochiton became extinct during the Permian period.

References 

Permian animals
Prehistoric chiton genera